Heidi Anne Lehrer, (born March 4, 1966) is a sprint canoer from Antigua and Barbuda who competed in the mid-1990s. At the 1996 Summer Olympics in Atlanta, she advanced to the repechages of the K-1 500 m event, but did not compete.

References

1966 births
Antigua and Barbuda female canoeists
Canoeists at the 1996 Summer Olympics
Living people
Olympic canoeists of Antigua and Barbuda
Antigua and Barbuda people of German descent